Swimming Pool is the last album by the noted British folk/blues/rock songwriter, guitarist and singer Al Jones. It marked his return to writing and recording after many years of relative obscurity. All the tracks are written by Jones himself and published by Rogue Music. The album was recorded at Le Nevek, Cornwall.

Track listing
"I'm So Happy"      
"Angelina"
"Your Face is Pink"
"There Goes the Sun"   
"Long Time Sleeping"
"Lady Mildred"
"Swimming Pool"
"Easy Life"
"Love and Money"
"Percy in a Hearse"
"You'd Better Get Out"
"In a Box"
"7 Old Hats"
"Down Again"
"Rock and Roll (Live)"
"In Stormy Weather"

Personnel
Al Jones - vocals, electro-acoustic guitars, Ashbory bass, Ashbory Plank
Shelley Trower - flute
Jake Walton - hurdy-gurdy
John Renbourn - guitar
Wizz Jones - guitar, vocals
George Stevens - percussion
Keith Marshall - drums, percussion
Justin Bennett - drums
Ivan Wellington - bass
Helen D'Amnation-Davies - violin
Emily Jones - voice
Jake Jones- piano, keyboard
Steve Turner- electric guitar, vocals

Catalogue number
Weekend Beatnik WEBE 9033 (UK, 1998)

Production
Re-mastering:Nick & Julie Turner, Watercolour Music
Post-production:Nick Freeth 
Photography and cover design: Jali Roll Martian

1998 albums